Attack of the Normans is a 1962 Italian film set in England in the early 9th century.  Viking incursions play a central role in the plot; "Normans" in the title is used in its original continental sense, meaning Viking.

This film was written by Nino Stresa and directed by Giuseppe Vari.

Cast
Cameron Mitchell as Wilfred, Duke of Saxony
Geneviève Grad as Svetania
Ettore Manni as Olivier D'Anglon
Philippe Hersent as James
Piero Lulli as Barton"
Paul Müller as Thomas
Franca Bettoia as Queen Patricia

Release
Attack of the Normans was released theatrically in Europe 19 October 1962. On its release in the United States in 1963, the film was cut to 79 minutes.

See also
 List of historical drama films

References

Bibliography

External links
 
 

1962 films
1960s historical films
Italian historical films
Films set in the 9th century
Films set in the Viking Age
Films set in England
Peplum films
Films directed by Giuseppe Vari
Sword and sandal
Sword and sandal films
1960s Italian films